Council elections for the Norwich City Council were held on 22 May 2014 as part of the 2014 United Kingdom local elections. The elections were moved from earlier on in May to coincide with the East of England 2014 European Parliament election.

One third of the council's 39 seats were  up for election in 2014, plus an extra seat in University ward, meaning a total of 14 seats in 13 wards. The other 25 seats were not contested in 2014.

The election saw no seats change hands, with the Council staying exactly as it had been in 2012. The Green Party had lost the County Council seat in Town Close ward to Labour in the 2013 election, but held their city council seat in these elections.

All changes in vote share are calculated with reference to the 2010 election, the last time these seats were contested.

Previous Composition
Before the election, Labour held all the seats in seven wards: Bowthorpe, Catton Grove, Chrome, Lakenham, Mile Cross, Sewell and University; the Green Party held all the seats in five wards: Mancroft, Nelson, Thorpe Hamlet, Town Close and Wensum; and the Liberal Democrats held all the seats in Eaton ward.

Election result

|-bgcolor=#F6F6F6
| colspan=2 style="text-align: right; margin-right: 1em" | Total
| style="text-align: right;" | 14
| colspan=4 style="text-align: right;" |Turnout
| style="text-align: right;" | 38.1%
| style="text-align: right;" | 41,378
| style="text-align: right;" | 
|-
|}

Changes in vote share are relative to the last time these seats were contested in 2010.

Council Composition

Prior to the election the composition of the council was:

After the election, the composition of the council was:

Ward results
Below are the ward-by-ward results.

Bowthorpe

Catton Grove

Crome

Eaton

Lakenham

Mancroft

Mile Cross

Nelson

Sewell

Thorpe Hamlet

Town Close

University
University ward elected two seats in this election, with each voter casting up to two votes under the plurality-at-large voting system.

Wensum

References 

2014 English local elections
2014
2010s in Norfolk